Ahmed Hassan (born 2 May 1975) is an Egyptian former professional footballer who played as an attacking midfielder or on the right wing. He is the fourth most capped international male footballer in history, having made 184 appearances for the Egypt national team. Hassan is regarded as one of the best players in African football history.

Club career

Early career 
Ahmed Hassan started his professional football career as a right-back at Aswan Club in the Egyptian lower divisions. After one season there, he moved to the more successful Ismaily. He was 20 when he was selected for the first time to play in the Egyptian national team's friendly match against Ghana on 29 December 1995. After his impressive performances with the Egyptian national team in the African Cup of Nations 1998, including scoring a goal from a long range shot against South Africa in the final that helped the squad win the tournament, Hassan joined Turkish side Kocaelispor at the age of 22. In 2000, he was transferred to Denizlispor before joining his Egyptian international teammate Abdel-Zaher El-Saqua in 2001 when he moved to Gençlerbirliği. Following three successful seasons with the club, during which the team twice made the Turkish Cup Final, he moved to Beşiktaş where he was a first team regular as well as a regular on the team's scoring sheet. He particularly impressed manager Jean Tigana who, despite being known for selecting younger players for his first team, still regarded the 30-year-old Hassan a key player of the squad. Tigana stated that "Hassan is a hardworking player who is quick and talented."

Anderlecht
After Hassan was named "Best Player of the African Cup of Nations 2006" he met Ziyad Abou Chair who gave him licence to play in foreign countries, Fulham, Rangers, Newcastle United, and Espanyol were reportedly interested in signing him. However, he chose to move to R.S.C. Anderlecht, the Belgian First Division champions, on a free transfer after choosing not to extend his contract with Beşiktaş, which ended in 2006. Hassan joined Anderlecht due to its automatic qualification to the UEFA Champions League and became an important part of the Anderlecht attack, setting up and scoring goals himself. His position in the midfield was in front of Lucas Biglia and Jan Polák, just behind the strikers Serhat Akin and Nicolas Frutos. In the 2007–08 season, he stated that that season would be his last for Anderlecht. His family had already returned to Egypt, and he followed them there.

Return to Egypt
Ahmed Hassan chose to move to Egyptian club Al Ahly to end his career in Egypt, signing a three-year contract as of May 2008. He scored in his first competitive match against legendary rival Zamalek, in the opening of the CAF Champions League, from a long-range free-kick. In September 2010 he suffered a career-threatening injury in an African Cup of Nations qualifier against Sierra Leone that would keep him away from the fields for six months.

On 19 July 2011, Hassan signed with Ahly's bitter rivals Zamalek to a two-year contract as a free transfer after his contract with Ahly expired. On 20 September 2011, Hassan made his official debut with Zamalek in a cup match against Wadi Degla giving a phenomenal performance and scoring two goals and helping his team defeat Degla 4–1 and qualify to the next round. When the league was stopped in February due to the Port Said Stadium disaster, Hassan had played in all 15 games for Zamalek finishing as top scorer of the team with 7 goals. He then scored in a CAF Champions League match against Moroccan Maghreb Fez with a header in the 81st minute. On 16 January Hassan scored in a friendly against Ukrainian giants FC Shakhtar Donetsk.

International career
Hassan has played in eight Africa Cup of Nations tournaments for Egypt, winning the tournament four times, in 1998, 2006, 2008 and 2010. In the 2006 tournament, he was named captain and scored four goals in six matches, the second-highest individual goal tally in that year's tournament. He was named best player of the tournament after winning his second title and Egypt's fifth, a feat he repeated in 2010 at the age of 34. In 2008, Hassan captained Egypt to their sixth Africa Cup of Nations victory. Ahmed Hassan is one of a number of players who have earned more than 100 international caps for Egypt, and is currently the third most capped male player for any country. He also holds the record for most Africa Cup of Nations won by any player in history.

Hassan broke Hossam Hassan's appearance record with his 170th cap for Egypt on 25 January 2010 in the Africa Cup of Nations quarter final against Cameroon. He had an eventful game: he headed an Achille Emaná corner into his own net (though Emana was credited with the goal); equalized from long range and claimed the final goal in a 3–1 win in extra time from a free-kick despite replays showing the ball did not cross the line. On 31 January 2010, Hassan picked up his fourth Africa Cup of Nations winners's medal as Egypt defeated Ghana 1–0 in the final.
In November 2011, Hassan played his 178th game for Egypt in a friendly against Brazil. In doing so he matched the record for international appearances. On 27 March 2012, Hassan started a friendly match against Kenya earning 184 international appearances.

Personal life 
Hassan was selected as an ambassador for the Holland–Belgium 2018 or 2022 World Cup bid along with Ruud Gullit. Hassan was the honorary president of the 2015 edition of the SATUC Football Cup, an international football competition for refugees and orphans.

Career statistics

International

Scores and results list Egypt's goal tally first, score column indicates score after each Hassan goal.

Honours 
Ismaily
 Egypt Cup: 1997

Beşiktaş
 Türkiye Kupası: 2005–06

Anderlecht
 Belgian First Division: 2006–07
 Belgian Cup: 2007–08
 Belgian Super Cup: 2006, 2007

Al Ahly
 Egyptian Premier League: 2008–09, 2009–10, 2010–11
 Egyptian Super Cup: 2008, 2010
 CAF Champions League: 2008
 African Super Cup: 2009

Zamalek
 Egypt Cup: 2013

Egypt
 African Cup of Nations: 1998, 2006, 2008, 2010

Individual
 Africa Cup of Nations Best Player: 2006, 2010
 African Inter-Club Player of the Year: 2010
 Africa Cup of Nations Dream Team: 2006, 2010

See also
List of men's footballers with 100 or more international caps

References

External links 

 
 
 SoccerEgypt.com 
 
 

1975 births
Living people
Egyptian footballers
Association football midfielders
Association football utility players
Aswan SC players
Ismaily SC players
Kocaelispor footballers
Denizlispor footballers
Gençlerbirliği S.K. footballers
Beşiktaş J.K. footballers
R.S.C. Anderlecht players
Al Ahly SC players
Zamalek SC players
Egyptian Premier League players
Süper Lig players
Belgian Pro League players
Egypt international footballers
1996 African Cup of Nations players
1998 African Cup of Nations players
1999 FIFA Confederations Cup players
2000 African Cup of Nations players
2002 African Cup of Nations players
2004 African Cup of Nations players
2006 Africa Cup of Nations players
2008 Africa Cup of Nations players
2009 FIFA Confederations Cup players
2010 Africa Cup of Nations players
Africa Cup of Nations-winning players
FIFA Century Club
Egyptian expatriate footballers
Egyptian expatriate sportspeople in Belgium
Egyptian expatriate sportspeople in Turkey
Expatriate footballers in Belgium
Expatriate footballers in Turkey
Egyptian football managers
Petrojet SC managers
Egyptian Premier League managers
People from Minya Governorate